Laupāhoehoe is a census-designated place (CDP) in Hawaii County, Hawaii, United States, in the District of North Hilo. The population was 581 at the 2010 census, up from 473 at the 2000 census. The community's name means "lava tip" and refers to the angular lava tip or cape formed by ancient pāhoehoe (smooth lava) flows which created the cape on which the community was built.

History

On April 1, 1946 the Big Island of Hawaii was struck by the so-called "April Fools Day tsunami", originating from the Aleutian Islands earthquake. Approximately 160 people on the island were killed. While the greatest number of deaths occurred in Hilo, the school building at Laupāhoehoe was inundated, and twenty students and four teachers were drowned. A monument to the dead now stands on Laupāhoehoe Point.

Geography
Laupāhoehoe is located on the northeast side of the island of Hawaii, at  (19.983296, -155.235889). Hawaii Route 19 passes through the community, leading southeast  to Hilo and west  to Waimea.

Climate

Demographics

As of the census of 2010, there were 581 people in 214 households residing in the CDP. The population density was 276.7 people per square mile (107.6/km2). The racial makeup of the CDP was 36.49% White, 0.34% African American, 0.17% American Indian & Alaska Native, 24.44% Asian, 4.82% Native Hawaiian & Pacific Islander, 0.86% from other races, and 32.87% from two or more races. Hispanic or Latino of any race were 18.59% of the population.

There were 214 households, out of which 28.0% had children under the age of 18 living with them.  The average household size was 2.71.

In the Laupāhoehoe CDP the population was spread out, with 23.9% under the age of 18, 5.0% from 18 to 24, 12.9% from 25 to 34, 15.1% from 35 to 49, 26.0% from 50 to 64, and 17.0% who were 65 years of age or older.  For every 100 females there were 105.3 males.  For every 100 males there were 95.0 females.

The median income for a household in the CDP at the 2000 census was $29,250, and the median income for a family in 2000 was $30,000. Males had a median income in 2000 of $21,667 versus $21,607 for females. The per capita income for the CDP in 2000 was $11,896.  About 28.4% of families and 25.2% of the population were below the poverty line in 2000, including 41.1% of those under age 18 and 14.0% of those age 65 or over.

References

External links
 Laupāhoehoe, Hawai'i is at coordinates .
 Laupahoehoe Train Museum

Census-designated places in Hawaii County, Hawaii
Populated places on Hawaii (island)
Monuments and memorials in Hawaii
Populated coastal places in Hawaii